The  is a  commuter rail line operated by the private railway operator Keikyu in Japan.

Service types
Three different types of service operate on the line, including all-stations "Local" trains, with through-running to and from the Keikyu Main Line. All services except Morning Wing services stop at all stations within the Keikyu Kurihama Line.

Abbreviations:
 Lo = : Stops at all stations up to Keikyū Kurihama
 LE = 
 LE = 
 MW = 
 KW =

Stations
All stations are located in Kanagawa Prefecture.

History
The section from Horinouchi to Kurihama (present-day Keikyu Kurihama) opened on 1 December 1942. The line was extended to Nobi on 1 November 1963, and the Keikyu factory at Kurihama opened at the same time. The line was further extended to Tsukuihama on 27 March 1966, and to Miurakaigan on 7 July 1966.

Direct limited express services between Miurakaigan and  began on 31 December 1969. ATS signalling was introduced on all Keikyu Lines on 12 November 1970. The final section from Miurakaigan to Misakiguchi opened on 26 April 1975.

From the start of the revised weekday timetable on 7 December 2015, two Morning Wing limited-stop commuter services from Miurakaigan to Shinagawa and Sengakuji in Tokyo were introduced. These stop at Yokosuka-chuo, Kanazawa-Bunko, and Kamiōoka en route.

See also
 List of railway lines in Japan

References

 
Kurihama Line
Railway lines in Kanagawa Prefecture